The 2006 Heineken Open was a ATP men's tennis tournament held at the ASB Tennis Centre in Auckland, New Zealand. It was the 39th edition of the tournament and was held from 9 January to 16 January 2006. Seventh-seeded Jarkko Nieminen won the singles title.

The semifinals featured a notable match between Jarkko Nieminen and Olivier Rochus. Nieminen triumphed in three sets after Rochus had saved 10 match points.

Finals

Singles

 Jarkko Nieminen defeated  Mario Ančić 6–2, 6–2

Doubles

 Andrei Pavel /  Rogier Wassen defeated  Simon Aspelin /  Todd Perry 6–3, 5–7, [10–4]

See also 
 2006 ASB Classic – women's tournament

References

External links
 
 Singles draw
 Doubles draw
 ATP – tournament profile

 
Heineken Open
ATP Auckland Open
Heineken Open, 2006
January 2006 sports events in New Zealand